David Saul Jerison is an American mathematician, a professor of mathematics and a MacVicar Faculty Fellow at the Massachusetts Institute of Technology, and an expert in partial differential equations and Fourier analysis.

Jerison did his undergraduate studies at Harvard University, received a bachelor's degree in 1975, and then went on to graduate studies at Princeton University. He earned a doctorate in 1980, with Elias M. Stein as his advisor, and after postdoctoral research at the University of Chicago, he came to MIT in 1981.

Awards and honors
In 1994, Jerison was an invited speaker at the International Congress of Mathematicians in Zurich. In 1999, he was elected as a fellow of the American Academy of Arts and Sciences. He became a MacVicar Fellow in 2004. In 2012, he became a fellow of the American Mathematical Society. In 2012, he received, jointly with John M. Lee, the Stefan Bergman Prize from the American Mathematical Society.

References

Year of birth missing (living people)
Living people
20th-century American mathematicians
21st-century American mathematicians
Harvard University alumni
University of Chicago staff
Princeton University alumni
Massachusetts Institute of Technology School of Science faculty
Fellows of the American Academy of Arts and Sciences
Fellows of the American Mathematical Society